The 1PZ is a 3.5 L (3469 cc) Inline 5-cylinder, 10-valve SOHC diesel engine. Bore is 94 mm and stroke is 100 mm, with a compression ratio of 22.7:1.

The engine's output is 114 hp (85 kW) at 4000 rpm, with 230 Nm (170 lbf-ft) of torque at 2600 rpm.

The 1PZ is a 5-cylinder variant of the 1HZ engine and as such it shares many of its internals with that engine.

Applications
 Toyota Land Cruiser 70 Series
 Toyota Coaster HBB20

References 

PZ
Diesel engines by model
Straight-five engines